Phoma caricae-papayae is a fungal plant pathogen infecting papayas.

References

External links 
 Index Fungorum
 USDA ARS Fungal Database

caricae-papayae
Fungal tree pathogens and diseases
Papaya tree diseases
Fungi described in 1955